Taimyr Pidgin Russian is a Russian pidgin spoken on the Taimyr Peninsula by the Nganasan people.  Before the expansion of universal education in the 20th century, most Nganasan spoke only their own language and pidgin Russian.

References

Russian-based pidgins and creoles